Liberty Township is one of fifteen townships in Effingham County, Illinois, USA.  As of the 2010 census, its population was 764 and it contained 350 housing units.

Geography

Cities, towns, villages
 Beecher City

Extinct towns
 Holland, Illinois

Cemeteries
The township contains these four cemeteries: Agney, Beecher, Memorial Gardens and Tipsword.

Major highways
  Illinois Route 33

Demographics

School districts
 Beecher City Community Unit School District 20

Political districts
 Illinois' 19th congressional district
 State House District 109
 State Senate District 55

References
 
 United States Census Bureau 2007 TIGER/Line Shapefiles
 United States National Atlas

External links
 City-Data.com
 Illinois State Archives

Townships in Effingham County, Illinois
1860 establishments in Illinois
Populated places established in 1860
Townships in Illinois